Cytoplasmic polyadenylation element-binding protein 1 is a protein that in humans is encoded by the CPEB1 gene.

This gene encodes a member of the cytoplasmic polyadenylation element (CPE) binding protein family. This highly conserved protein binds to a specific RNA sequence called the CPE found in the 3' UTR of some mRNAs. Similar proteins in Xenopus and mouse function to induce cytoplasmic polyadenylation of dormant mRNAs with short polyA tails, resulting in their translation. Members of this protein family regulate translation of cyclin B1 during embryonic cell divisions. Multiple transcript variants encoding different isoforms have been found for this gene.

References

Further reading

External links